NK Slavonac can refer to several football teams in Slavonia, Croatia.

 NK Slavonac Brodski Stupnik
 NK Slavonac Bukovlje
 NK Slavonac Đurđanci
 NK Slavonac Gornja Bebrina
 NK Slavonac Gradište
 NK Slavonac Gunjavci-Drežnik
 NK Slavonac Komletinci
 NK Slavonac Ladimirevci
 NK Slavonac Nova Kapela
 NK Slavonac Preslatinci
 NK Slavonac Pribiševci
 NK Slavonac Prkovci
 NK Slavonac Slatinik Drenjski
 NK Slavonac Slavonski Kobaš
 NK Slavonac CO (Stari Perkovci)